Wreckovation is a portmanteau term coined by Catholics to describe the style of renovations which some Catholic cathedrals, churches, and oratories have undergone since the Second Vatican Council.

Background

In the Tridentine Roman Missal, the altar is assumed to be ad orientem (towards the East) even when it is versus populum (facing the people): "Si altare sit ad orientem, versus populum, celebrans versa facie ad populum, non vertit humeros ad altare, cum dicturus est Dóminus vobiscum, Oráte, fratres, Ite, missa est, vel daturus benedictionem" (If the altar is ad orientem, towards the people, the celebrant, facing the people, does not turn his back to the altar when about to say Dominus vobiscum ["The Lord be with you"], Orate, fratres [the introduction to the prayer over the offerings of bread and wine], and Ite, missa est [the dismissal at the conclusion of the Mass], or about to give the blessing). The wording remained unchanged in all later editions of the Tridentine Missal, even the last. The tabernacle containing the consecrated Eucharist was commonly placed on the main altar of a church (this also was not envisaged in the 1570 Roman Missal and only later became normal (see Church tabernacle History)

Holy See initiative on church design
In November 2011, Antonio Cañizares Llovera, Prefect of the Congregation for Divine Worship, established a "Liturgical Art and Sacred Music Commission" which will be responsible for evaluating both new construction and renovation projects as well as music used during the celebration of Mass to ensure that they comply with Church guidelines. He had the full support of Pope Benedict XVI, who considered the commission's task "very urgent."

Criticism 
Opponents of wreckovation also charge that such changes are iconoclastic and produce results that look more like Protestant churches, theaters, airport terminals, or barns rather than Catholic churches. A major concern is that the design of renovated churches downplays the sense of the sacred in favor of focus on the congregation. Critics see this as inconsistent with the traditional Catholic understanding of communal worship. Meanwhile, more liberal Catholics have referred to the renovations as necessary steps in order to emphasise the role of the congregation in worship, in accord with the wishes of the Second Vatican Council. Conservative Catholics charge that this is a misinterpretation of the documents of Vatican II.

Some churches are reversing prior renovations and returning to the historical Catholic liturgical setup.

Related renovation controversies
 Cathedral of Our Lady of the Angels (Los Angeles) § Criticism
 Cathedral of St. John the Evangelist (Milwaukee) § Renovation and controversy

References

Further reading 
 U.S. Catholic's "Who Moved the Tabernacle?" article
 US Conference of Catholic Bishops write on Environment and Art in Catholic Worship
 

Neologisms
Catholic architecture